Seven Days is a 2007 South Korean crime thriller film directed by Won Shin-yun, starring Yunjin Kim and Park Hee-soon.

The film had 2,107,849 admissions nationwide and was the 9th most-attended domestic film of 2007. In 2008, Kim won Best Actress at the Grand Bell Awards, and Park won Best Supporting Actor at the Blue Dragon Film Awards and Korean Film Awards.

The film has also been remade in Bollywood titled Jazbaa.

Plot 
Yoo Ji-yeon (Yunjin Kim) is a prominent lawyer, who has yet to lose a case. While Ji-yeon is taking part in a parents-only race at her daughter's field day, her daughter disappears.

Later in the day, Ji-yeon receives a phone call from the man who abducted her daughter. The man makes it clear that he is not interested in her money. Rather, he tells her that the only way she will ever see her daughter again is to defend a five-time convicted felon who is appealing his conviction for rape and murder. Ji-yeon has only seven days before his trial ends.

Cast 
 Yunjin Kim as Yoo Ji-yeon, a lawyer and mother
 Park Hee-soon as Kim Seong-yeol, a police detective
 Kim Mi-sook as Han Sook-hee, a professor of psychology  
 Choi Moo-sung as Jeong Cheol-jin
 Jang Hang-sun
 Seo Dong-soo as Dr. Jo
 Shin Hyeon-jong as Mr. Oh
 Kwon Byeong-gil as Park Ki-bok
 Yang Jin-woo as Kang Ji-won, a rock singer
 Jung Dong-hwan as Kang Sang-man
 Lee Jeong-heon as a public prosecutor
 Oh Kwang-rok as Yang Chang-goo

Awards and nominations

Remake
A Bollywood remake titled Jazbaa (lit. "Passion") starring Aishwarya Rai and Irrfan Khan was released on October 9, 2015.

References

External links 
 
 
 
 
 

2007 films
2007 crime thriller films
2007 thriller drama films
South Korean crime thriller films
Police detective films
Films about drugs
Films about organized crime in South Korea
Films set in psychiatric hospitals
Films shot in Busan
Films directed by Won Shin-yun
2000s Korean-language films
2000s police procedural films
South Korean films remade in other languages
2007 drama films
2000s South Korean films